James Edward Folston (born August 14, 1971 in Cocoa, Florida) is a former American football linebacker in the National Football League. He played for the Los Angeles/Oakland Raiders and the Arizona Cardinals.

Early years
Folston attended Cocoa High School in Cocoa, Florida and participated in Football, basketball, and track. Folston was athletic and fortunate enough to earn a football scholarship after playing only one year of varsity football.

College career

Folston accepted a scholarship to attend Northeast Louisiana University which is now University of Louisiana at Monroe. As a sophomore Folston cracked the starting lineup as a Defensive end. During his junior season the pro scouts and collegiate All-America voters began to take notice of Folston's abilities on the field. During his third year in a ULM uniform he recorded 12 sacks. In 1993, he ended his career with 27 sacks, which ranks first on the all-time sacks list.

Following his senior season he was selected as an All American by the Associated Press, the Walter Camp Foundation, Football Gazette, and Pro Football Weekly. Folston was also 1st team All Louisiana and 1st team All Southland Conference during his junior and senior seasons for head coach Dave Roberts. Folston earned ULM's Iron Man Award and was chosen to play in the East–West Shrine Game and the Hula Bowl at the conclusion of his senior season.

Folston was invited to the 1994 NFL combine.

Folston is considered one of the greatest Defensive ends in school history. He played the game with passion and violent intentions. Playing with those traits put him in position to be inducted into the University of Louisiana at Monroe Athletics Hall of Fame in 2010.

Professional career

Los Angeles Raiders/Oakland Raiders
Folston was drafted by the Los Angeles Raiders in the 2nd round of the 1994 NFL draft. 
Folston played for the Raiders for 5 seasons.(1994–1998)

Arizona Cardinals
Folston played for the Arizona Cardinals for 3 seasons. (1999–2001)

References

Added 

1971 births
Living people
People from Cocoa, Florida
American football linebackers
Louisiana–Monroe Warhawks football players
Los Angeles Raiders players
Oakland Raiders players
Arizona Cardinals players